Rockbridge is a village in Greene County, Illinois, United States. The population was 169 at the 2010 census.

Geography
Rockbridge is located in southeastern Greene County at  (39.272262, -90.203540). Illinois Route 267 passes along the eastern edge of the village, leading north  to Greenfield and south  to Medora.

Demographics

As of the census of 2000, there were 189 people, 84 households, and 63 families residing in the village. The racial makeup of the village was 100.00% White. Hispanic or Latino of any race were 0.53% of the population.

There were 84 households, out of which 25.0% had children under the age of 18 living with them, 61.9% were married couples living together, 9.5% had a female householder with no husband present, and 25.0% were non-families. 21.4% of all households were made up of individuals, and 11.9% had someone living alone who was 65 years of age or older.  The average household size was 2.25 and the average family size was 2.59.

In the village, the population was spread out, with 16.9% under the age of 18, 8.5% from 18 to 24, 24.3% from 25 to 44, 28.6% from 45 to 64, and 21.7% who were 65 years of age or older.  The median age was 45 years. For every 100 females, there were 96.9 males.  For every 100 females age 18 and over, there were 91.5 males.

The median income for a household in the village was $31,667, and the median income for a family was $36,250. Males had a median income of $25,714 versus $17,344 for females. The per capita income for the village was $16,243.  About 9.8% of families and 7.2% of the population were below the poverty line, including 7.7% of those under the age of eighteen and 8.5% of those 65 or over.

References

Villages in Greene County, Illinois
Villages in Illinois